J. R. R. Tolkien's The Hobbit has been translated into many languages. Known translations, with their first date of publication, are:

See also
Translations of The Lord of the Rings

References

J. R. R. Tolkien lists
The Hobbit
Hobbit, The
Lists of fantasy books
Translation-related lists